Désiré-Alexandre Batton (January 2, 1798 in Paris – October 15, 1855 in Versailles) was a French composer.  A student of Luigi Cherubini at the Conservatoire de Paris, he composed operas and cantatas; a number of his operas were seen at the Théâtre Feydeau and the Opéra-Comique.  In 1817 he took first second price in the Prix de Rome competition for his cantata La Mort d' Adonis.

It was after winning the prize and when he became associated with Gioachino Rossini that it is believed he introduced the composer to the romantic poem by Walter Scott, The Lady of the Lake, which became the basis of the romantic opera, La donna del lago.

In 1842 Batton became inspector of music schools in France and in 1849 he began teaching at the Conservatoire.

Works

La Mort d'Adonis, cantata, 1817
La Reconnaissance, cantata
Le Prisonnier d'État, opera
Le camp du drap d'or, opera

La fenêtre secrète, opera,  1818
Velleda, opera, 1820
Ethelvina, opera, 1827
La marquise de Brinvilliers, opera,  1831
Le Remplacant, opera, 1837

References
Notes

Sources
Gossett, Philip (1983), "La Donna del Lago and the revival of the Rossini 'opera seria' " in the booklet accompanying the 1983 Pollini recording.

1798 births
1855 deaths
French male classical composers
French opera composers
Male opera composers
Conservatoire de Paris alumni
Academic staff of the Conservatoire de Paris
Prix de Rome for composition
Musicians from Paris
19th-century French male musicians